Ben Krefta (born 10 October 1982 in the UK) is a freelance manga style illustrator and graphic artist.

Krefta has created several 'how-to' books on the topic of drawing manga, including 'The Art of Drawing Manga' (2003), 'Step by Step Manga' (2004), 'Digital Manga' (2014), 'The Artists Guide to Drawing Manga' (2016) and was also one of three winners of 2004's 'Character Design' category at the International Manga and Anime Festival (IMAF).

Krefta currently works on a wide variety of art and design projects including: advertising, promotional artwork, web design and specializing in character design using a combination of traditional media and Photoshop. Some examples of these works along with more information on Krefta can be found at BenKrefta.com.

Published works
 The Art of Drawing Manga (Paperback)
 Drawing Manga in Simple Steps
 Step-By-Step Manga
 Digital Manga
 The Artists Guide to Drawing Manga

References

External links
 BenKrefta.com - Manga and anime inspired artwork and projects by Ben Krefta as well as in-depth bio.

1982 births
British comics artists
British digital artists
Living people